None Too Soon is the ninth studio album by guitarist Allan Holdsworth, released on 24 September 1996 by Polydor Records (Japan), JMS–Cream Records (Europe) and Restless Records (United States); a remastered edition was reissued on 17 April 2012 through MoonJune Records.

In a slight departure from Holdsworth's usual solo work, the album is composed mainly of jazz standard interpretations, as well as two original pieces written by pianist and longtime collaborator Gordon Beck. Both musicians had previously worked together on the albums Sunbird (1979), The Things You See (1980) and With a Heart in My Song (1988). The rhythm section are bassist Gary Willis and drummer Kirk Covington, both of fusion band Tribal Tech.

Overview
In a 1996 interview, Holdsworth explained the reasoning for not including any original material written by himself: "Gordon Beck once suggested that I should do an album with more well known tunes so people can hear what I sound like over these tunes. ... The other good reason for this choice is that I haven't written enough original material to fill an album." On the selection of songs, Holdsworth stated: "We absolutely didn't want to play all the classic standards everybody is playing already ... I definitely didn't want to do any of my own tunes this time." On the type of jazz being played: "It's not a trad album. It's a bebop album, but with a wrench or two in there." According to Holdsworth, Beck's use of a digital piano (as opposed to a regular one) was something to which the latter was not accustomed.

The album was recorded in October 1994, but was not released worldwide until almost two years later due to problems between Holdsworth and Polydor: "I had a lot of problems with the record company. I was signed to a certain company for a world deal. ... Then they informed me that they weren't going to release it anywhere else in the world just because one guy didn't like the music!"

Critical reception

None Too Soon has received mixed reviews. Chris M. Slawecki at All About Jazz likened Holdsworth's playing and interpretations to the Mahavishnu Orchestra, Pat Metheny and John Scofield, whilst praising Beck's work on the title track as "well-considered and articulate in design and execution". John Kelman, also at All About Jazz, remarked that the album had "a kind of restrained power that makes this not exactly a fusion record, but not exactly a straight-ahead one either".

Michael G. Nastos at AllMusic praised Holdsworth's unique style, but suggested a need for him to show restraint during his usual passages and try different sounds. Jason Josephes at Pitchfork panned the album, calling it "excretable wankery that includes the single worst cover of 'Norwegian Wood' that could possibly be produced."

Track listing

Personnel
Allan Holdsworth – guitar, SynthAxe, engineering, mixing, production
Gordon Beck – digital piano
Kirk Covington – drums
Gary Willis – bass

Technical
Bernie Grundman – mastering
Chris Bellman – remastering (reissue)
Leonardo Pavkovic – executive production (reissue)

References

External links
None Too Soon at therealallanholdsworth.com (archived)

Allan Holdsworth albums
1996 albums
Polydor Records albums
Restless Records albums